Project Lives is a book that appears to live at the interstices of Photography and Urban Studies. It is edited by George Carrano, Chelsea Davis, and Jonathan Fisher and seems to be their first book. The work is essentially a collection of photographs of life in the New York public housing projects, photos that the editorial team equipped and trained the residents to take themselves. The photographs are underlain by a narrative documenting the challenges faced by residents, explaining what has brought this environment to its current state, and suggesting the stakes involved in the restoration of a once proud civic achievement. The book's purpose, according to its editors, is to showcase an authentic view of the projects to counter a generation-long media focus on crime, disrepair, degradation, and despair; and in so doing restart government support of homes to half a million New Yorkers.  All editor royalties are being donated to resident programs at NYCHA (as the New York City Housing Authority is known).

Critics in the United States and elsewhere praised Project Lives for its insights into life in homes on the verge of government abandonment; for the striking dignity of the photographers and their subjects; and for the book's shattering of decades-old stereotypes.

Exhibitions of photographs featured in the book have taken place in the New York metropolitan area.

Background 
The book is built upon one what it terms one of the largest participatory photography programs ever undertaken, which the editors brought to the New York City Housing Authority in 2010 on behalf of the 501(c)(3) non-profit Seeing for Ourselves. Participants recruited from the projects were given single-use film cameras and trained in a twelve-week lecture/workshop course in photography.  In between sessions, the participants would put into practice the lesson learned at the previous class.  As Davis would tell CUNY-TV, "We talked a little bit about photography technique, such as light and shadow, or camera language, or composition.  And we talked a little bit about the history of photography, and offered some inspirational photographers.  And then the latter half was the photographers sharing their own work." According to the book, cameras were donated by Kodak and computers by Dell Computers, while film was processed at cost by Duggal Visual Solutions.  Beginning in a project in West Harlem that fall with 15 participants, the program is said by the book to have mushroomed to serving hundreds of residents of 16 projects by the time it ended in the spring of 2013.  The program was covered by a New York City tabloid early on.

Photographers 
The works of 42 different photographers are featured in Project Lives.  They are overwhelmingly children, preteens, and seniors.  We meet four of them in the first section of the book, as the narrative is turned over to first-person accounts by Marcia Morales, Jared Wellington, Gertrude Livingston, and Aaliyah Colon, in this order.  Wellington and Colon are youngsters while Morales and Livingston are seniors.  From their stories, all seem to have lived in the projects for a long time.

Margaret Wells is another senior, while Znya Mourning is another youngster.  Znya was interviewed by WPIX11 TV-NY April 10. Both Wells and Mourning were interviewed on National Public Radio (NPR) July 23.  Both photographers spoke of what it's like to live in the projects and be viewed through a distorted lens.  Wells told NPR, "There's still a normalcy about what's going on."  Znya advised NPR, "Everybody sees the word 'project' in a different way.  I see it as a place where I live.  I don't see it in a negative aspect."

Photographs 
There are 84 full-color photographs arising from the program, representing the "main event", as the preface calls it.  Some show the inside of the projects, others the exterior; some feature people, most often project residents, while others are interior still lifes and landscapes.

There are no photographs of crime, disrepair, or anything else negative, the kind of imagery long favored by the media and which according to the book this program was designed to counteract.  The editors told many reviewers that they had simply advised the participants to photograph what was important to them; the total absence of stopped toilets and bullet casings and their like in the photographs was the editors' greatest delight. They viewed this as testimony to the human spirit; people—and perhaps public housing residents in particular—can and do rise above their surroundings.   As Carrano would tell one reviewer, "They place a higher value on their sense of community, their sense of sharing with their neighbors than complaining about disrepair. It's humbling." Fisher acknowledged to another, "If I lived in the projects I might be focusing on something else."

Editors and book origins 
Carrano, Davis and Fisher describe themselves in Project Lives as native New Yorkers raised in different eras.  The book shows that the courses were taught by Davis, and this is confirmed by the book website. While the book's preface indicates that although all editors arranged the photographs, only Carrano and Fisher handled narration duties.  The book's website reveals that Carrano and Davis had extensive experience in participatory photography prior to Project Lives, while Fisher had only been involved tangentially.   Carrano curated exhibits of war photojournalism and participatory photography that The New York Times termed "poignant" and "required viewing." Meanwhile, Davis had done art enrichment stints at New York's Association for Metro Area Autistic Children and St. Louis Children's Hospital, the latter including starting up a participatory photography effort in the oncology ward, a program that continues to exist. Video work created by Fisher and Davis won NYCHA an award from the National Association of Government Communicators in 2014.

The website further discloses that it was Carrano who had brought the program to the housing authority on behalf of his Seeing for Ourselves 501 (c)(3)non-profit, and Davis and Fisher worked for and/or at the agency.  The Long Island Press indicates that Carrano and Fisher had previously both worked for New York's Metropolitan Transportation Authority, which led to the inspiration for Project Lives.
As Carrano described it, "I started working for the New York City Transit Authority back in the ‘70s and the garage where I was working in is directly across from the street from the Manhattanville Houses, which is a very large housing project in Harlem built in the late ‘60s. So I used to walk through there on the way to work and I never felt threatened, never felt uncomfortable. It was just another New York community."

Composition and publication 
The photographs are introduced by a section describing the program, the purpose, the publicity, and the pictures.  Thirty-odd photos in, the narrative widens out to site the projects in the context of today's affordable housing crisis.  Another thirty-odd photographs and the narrative focuses on the stakes involved in restoring the environment to a decent state – for the residents, for New York City, and for the nation. The city of St. Louis appears many times in the book, as its destruction of its Pruitt-Igoe public housing complex 197275 according to the book not only sent residents fleeing for parts far and wide, but set off a generation-long devaluing of the public sector in the US, helping to create the harsher social fabric of today.  The all-in consequences of a failure of New York's projects, according to Project Lives, may be too frightening to contemplate.

The pace then quickens, as following only a handful of photos the narrative suggests some answers, after which another handful of pictures closes out the book.  The narrative touches on specific photographs only briefly, leaving it to the photographers to have their say about what they have depicted.  The reader is left to combine the narrative and photographs mentally.

In this book only the resident photographers and their subjects are accorded names.  Project Lives features a tribute by John T. Hill on the back of the book jacket, which describes Hill as a former director of graduate studies in photography at Yale University and the author of Walker Evans: The Hungry Eye.  Hill likens Project Lives to the seminal work of Jacob Riis.

The book was published by powerHouse Books on April 7, 2015.

Website 
The book website contains background information, sample photographs, links to social media, a blog, and more.

Reception 
Project Lives was featured as a news story or reviewed by some two dozen local, national, and international media outlets by July 2015, with much coverage featuring elaborate extracts from the photography collection.   The circulation of this media numbers in the tens of millions, and so the photographs may have been viewed by orders of magnitude more than who read the book itself.

All notices and TV spots were positive.  Most coverage featured interviews with the editors, and common questions included how the program began, what the workshops were like, what the editors hope to achieve, and whether there were any surprises.

The New York Times noted that "Most New Yorkers know what public housing looks like from the outside, but a bracingly simple compilation of pictures takes us into the interiors of the buildings and thus into the residents' startlingly ordinary lives." Noting the book's focus on Pruitt-Igoe, Politico Magazine advised that NYCHA's ability to make a comeback will have a crucial bearing on the shape of the country's future safety net. BuzzFeed enthused: "Beautiful…an unprecedented and intimate look into the lives of New York City public housing residents." Time described Project Lives straightforwardly. Slate'''s Behold blog turned to editor Carrano for a summing up:  "By presenting this look at life in the projects, people in New York and beyond will see why they are worth funding and call for action."

The intellectual New York Review of Books featured a photograph from Project Lives to illustrate an essay on poverty. New York Magazine called Project Lives "A startlingly simple and optimistic portrait" of project life. The Long Island Press noted the large impact of a physically small volume. National Public Radio's Leonard Lopate of WNYC, interviewing Davis and photographers Wells and Mourning, termed the book as fascinating.

Across the Atlantic, Dazed and We Heart, both of the UK; and Annabelle of Switzerland reviewed the book warmly.

Back in the US, specialized journals took note of the book. Apogee Photo Magazine, aCurator Magazine, and American Photo all praised it from the angle of photography.

On local TV, NY1-TV described Project Lives as a wonderful book. Meanwhile, WPIX 11 NY-TV commented: "Hundreds of participants…embraced the role of storyteller and took back the power from decades of stereotypes," concluding, "A great story!" CUNY-TV praised the photographs as stunning.Refinery29 concluded simply, "An incredibly moving book."

Only one review raised even a hint of criticism, and that was Brooklyn Magazine, which in an exhaustive and positive piece wondered at one point about the appropriateness of the disposable single-use film cameras before allowing Davis to explain the benefits, and also suggested there are issues with advocacy art in general. The review nevertheless ended on a glowing note.

The book website indicates a growing fan base for Project Lives, including New York City First Lady Chirlane McCray, former US President Jimmy Carter, New York State Governor Andrew Cuomo, and US Supreme Court Justice Sonia Sotomayor. McCray's tweet and Facebook post are shown in the book website but no communications from the other personalities are provided.

In 2015, the book won the Photography award at the New York Book Festival.  The following year, Project Lives was a Finalist in both the Current Events/Social Change and Multicultural Non-Fiction categories at the Next Generation Indie Book Awards.  Also in 2016, the book won the Montaigne Medal in the Eric Hoffer Awards for the year's most thought-provoking book.

 Reaction of Housing Authority 
The reaction of NYCHA to Project Lives is not known.  The program remains online in a long-since updated NYCHA micro-site.  The book documents agency missteps in line with describing the negative media image of the projects.  On the other hand, Project Lives defends the agency repeatedly.   For example, the book says that because government funding of the projects was cut as the infrastructure was aging past its useful life, it was all but guaranteed that the agency could not keep up.  The book indicates that while the agency's command and control practice was outdated, plans were afoot in 2014 by the new regime to devolve more power to local building management.  In the book, the photographs are offered for NYCHA's use as a refunding argument.  Project Lives argues that, contrary to a public outcry, the agency's delay in placing closed-circuit television cameras at Boulevard Houses did not set the stage for the notorious killing of a six-year old resident in June 2014.   As mentioned previously, all editor royalties are being donated to resident programs at the agency.  Finally, the book's outlook on Bill de Blasio is clearly favorable, crediting him with proposing safety enhancement measures, relieving NYCHA from the burden of paying for its own police protection, and raising the issue of economic inequality.

 Funding progress since publication 
The book indicates that its aim is to restart support of the New York projects by all levels of government.  There were reports of moves by New York City and New York State to restart support of the projects shortly before Project Lives came out. The refunding effort reportedly has not gone smoothly, with the state attempting to keep NYCHA from controlling its contribution and the city pushing back. The city comptroller, whose harshly critical views of NYCHA are recorded in Project Lives, continued issuing negative audits of the agency.

What impact all this controversy has in the higher stakes game of restoring federal funding—the book's other goal—is not known.  In any event, according to the book itself, smarter people than its editors will need to figure out the new funding paradigm.  Carrano advised the Long Island Press, "I would like to see the resident photographers who participated in this book have an opportunity to testify in Congress on hearings that focus on affordable housing.  Sympathetic Congressmen could hold ad hoc hearings in the Rayburn building and bring together like-minded Congress-people to hear testimony of people living in public housing.  That would be a valuable way to shine light on this issue."

 Exhibitions 

Photographs featured in Project Lives were exhibited at the powerHouse Arena in DUMBO April 6–20, 2015 and Artspace Patchogue May 23-June 10, 2015. An exhibit at the fotofoto Gallery in Huntington ran July 31-August 29, 2015, and at the Art League of Long Island June 21-August 22, 2016.  Project Lives'' was included in exhibitions about affordable New York City housing at both the Museum of the City of New York, September 18, 2015 – February 7, 2016, and the Hunter East Harlem Gallery, February 10-May 15, 2016.

References

External links 
 http://www.powerhousebooks.com/books/project-lives/
 http://www.projectlivesbook.com/

2015 non-fiction books
Photographic collections and books
Public housing in New York City
PowerHouse Books books